The Oxford Centre for Mission Studies (OCMS) is in the former SS Philip and James Parish Church on Woodstock Road, Oxford, England, opposite Leckford Road. It was established in 1983.

The centre exists to provide education for church leaders from the non-Western world. It was founded by mission theologians from Africa, Asia and Latin America. OCMS offers taught Masters courses and PhD/MPhil research degrees. Its degrees are validated by Middlesex University. It is associated with the University of Oxford through the Bodleian Libraries. Many Oxford faculty members also provide supervision for PhD/MPhil research degrees.

Building
The building was designed by the Gothic Revival architect George Edmund Street and built in 1860–62. Samuel Wilberforce, then Bishop of Oxford, consecrated it as the parish church of Saints Philip and James on 8 May 1862. The tower and spire, also designed by Street, were added in 1864–66. It is a Grade I listed building.

Immediately to the south is Church Walk, a pedestrian-only link between Woodstock Road and North Parade. On the south side of Church Walk is the former vicarage, 68 Woodstock Road, designed by Street's former assistant, Harry Drinkwater, and built in 1887. The vicarage is a Grade II listed building and is now part of St Antony's College, Oxford.

References

Sources

External links

Oxford Centre for Mission Studies

Centre for Mission Studies
Churches completed in 1862
Centre for Mission Studies
Former churches in Oxford
G. E. Street buildings
Grade I listed buildings in Oxford
Grade I listed churches in Oxfordshire
Centre for Mission Studies
Christian organizations established in 1983
1983 establishments in England
Middlesex University